Thambi Naidoo (1875 - 1933) was an early collaborator of Mahatma Gandhi. Born in 1875 in Mauritius to Tamil migrants from India, he migrated to Kimberley (then part of the Cape Colony) in 1889. He moved to Johannesburg in 1892 where he worked as a greengrocer. From 1906 to 1913, he helped Gandhi in the South African Indian communities as they struggled against pre-Apartheid racial repression by the local white and the colonial British authorities in Durban.

References

 

South African people of Tamil descent
South African politicians of Indian descent
1875 births
1933 deaths
Migrants from British Mauritius to Cape Colony